Memory Hole 1 consists of an 80-minute radio program that Kevin Moore did for Radio For Peace International, combined with ambient, electronic and muzak music in the background. The album was made along with other collaborators: some monologues were recorded by Bob Nekrasov in Ciudad Colon. Daniel Beierstettel, and Theron Patterson contributed with music to some tracks. Radio samples were contributed by Radio For Peace International station owner James Latham. Music from Múm, Fela Kuti and The Who were sampled in some tracks.

Track listing

External links
Kevin Moore's Bandcamp.com page

2004 albums